This is a discography of South Indian composer and lyricist Hamsalekha. As of 2013, he has scored music for about 324 Kannada films and few Telugu and Tamil films.

Discography

See also
 Hamsalekha

References

External links

 
Hamsalekha Indian artist

Discographies of Indian artists